Candidianus may refer to:
 Candidianus (son of Galerius), 4th century-son of the Roman Emperor Galerius and adopted son of Galeria Valeria
 Candidianus (Patriarch of Aquileia), Patriarch of Grado, 606-612